Thani Oruvan is a 2015 Indian Tamil-language action thriller film directed by Mohan Raja and written by Raja and Suresh and Balakrishnan. Produced by Kalpathi S. Aghoram, S. Ganesh and S. Suresh under the studio AGS Entertainment, it stars Jayam Ravi, Arvind Swamy and Nayanthara while Ganesh Venkataraman, Harish Uthaman, Nassar, Thambi Ramaiah, Mugdha Godse, amongst others play supporting roles.

The plot revolves around IPS Officer Mithran, who wants to arrest Siddharth Abhimanyu, an affluent scientist who uses secret illegal medical practices for profit. Thani Oruvan was Raja's original story concept, unlike his previous ventures, which were remakes. Principal photography commenced on 6 December 2013, with filming took place in various locations including Chennai, Bangalore, Hyderabad, Dehradun, Mussoorie, and other locations.

The cinematography and editing were handled by Ramji and Gopi Krishna respectively. The music was composed by Hiphop Tamizha, in which the soundtrack album received positive reviews. The film was released on 28 August 2015, to critical acclaim, with critics praising the performances of Jayam Ravi and Aravind Swamy, especially the latter and also Thambi Ramaiah, pace, screenplay, storyline & direction. It was a commercial success, and also became one of the highest grossing Tamil films of the year.

The film was remade in Telugu as Dhruva (2016), and in Bengali as One (2017). Following the film's success, director Mohan Raja is planning for a sequel, titled Thani Oruvan 2.

Plot 
1980: A low-level party cadre Sengalvarayan was dedicated to his regional leader Tamizhvanan  and party, to the extent that he is working for a party meeting when his wife goes into labour. Accidentally, Tamizhvanan comes to the area of Sengalvarayan's house, and lends his car to take Sengalvarayan's wife to the labour ward, but the delivery happens safely inside the car.

1996: Sengalvarayan's son Pazhani secures the first rank in his 10th standard state exam, and visits Tamizhvanan, now the chairman of the party and a member of the ruling coalition, for his blessings with his father. While they are waiting in the party office for the leader to come in, they witness an accidental murder of a rebel in the party, by Tamizhvanan due to caste-related comments by the rebel on him. When Tamizhvanan asks Sengalvarayan to take the blame by saying that he killed the man due to rage about the rebel's comments, Pazhani volunteers to take the blame and is willing to go to prison, citing the leniency of juvenile laws in exchange for an MLA seat for his father in the upcoming by-elections.  Tamizhvanan accepts and Sengalvarayan later becomes an MLA.

2015: Trainee IPS officers Mithran, Shakthi, Suraj, Kathiresan and Janardhan discreetly assist the police in catching a gang which kidnapped four girls. One day, Mithran receives a cryptic text message on his phone from an anonymous number stating that they are aware of their discreet activities. In the evening, they go out to meet that person who is revealed to be a forensic pathologist and Mithran's ex-girlfriend Mahima. Later that same night, they happen to witness the murder of a man named Ramar, who is a social activist with the pretence of snatch theft. Mithran and his friend catch the gang and their leader and hand them over to the police. 4 days later, the leader of the gang comes to the IPS headquarters with the Home minister.

This political and organised crime comes as a shock to Mithran and his friends. Mithran takes them to his house and shows his research on connecting all small unrelated incidents into the global view of a hidden crime network, who bend the law for their own financial benefits. He singles out three influential persons: pharmaceutical mogul Ashok Pandian, mineral magnate Charles Chelladurai and chieftain Perumal Swamy. When he tries following one, he realizes that all three of them work as a group, and they all work for a wealthy and influential scientist Siddharth Abhimanyu. After the completion of his training, Mithran is awarded medals for specializing in dealing with organized crime during training and also for being the best probationer of the batch, and is posted as the ASP of the Organized Crime Unit.

Mithran discovers that Siddharth is Sengalvarayan's son Pazhani. After his release from prison, Pazhani had his name changed and left India to complete his education abroad. After his graduation, he returned to India and is now a well-established scientist. Siddharth uses the medical field for the wrong reasons and for his own profit. Sengalvarayan is now the incumbent Health Minister in the minority government headed by Tamizhvanan, who is now the CM. At that time, Angelina, a Swiss pharmaceutical company owner and activist, tries to make generic medicines for life-threatening diseases available in India at low cost affordable by poor people. Siddharth's assassin kills Angelina before she can sign the agreement document with the government and shoots Mithran at the same time.

While Mithran is recovering from the gunshot wound in the hospital, an electronic bug (GPS + audio transmitter) is implanted during surgery by Siddharth. Through the bug, Siddharth listens to all of Mithran's plans and continuously monitors his whereabouts and conversations via audio transmission. Then comes evidence against Siddharth in the form of Manimekalai. Manimekalai was a scientist at Siddharth's research lab, where a seaweed that can cure diabetes is found abundantly in the oceans. Siddharth tries to sell the technology and rights to extract medicine from the seaweed to multinational pharmaceutical companies, but is opposed by Manimekalai. So Siddharth hires goons and kill her. But before being killed, she records a video and stores it in an SD card so that someone will find it.

Before Mithran can find the card, Siddharth finds out and assigns Vicky, Perumal Swamy's brother, to recover the card, but Mithran tells Jana to get the card. He successfully gets the card after a fight with Vicky, but through the bug, Siddharth knows this and kills Jana. Mithran comes back to his special house where he finds a pin that has been changed in a picture which turns out to be the picture of Ananya, who was Miss World 2011 and a close acquaintance of Siddharth whose girlfriend Shilpa was also part of that event. Mithran doubts whether Siddharth himself would have come to his house. Mahima checks the fingerprints on the pin keeping the gun case Mithran received from Siddharth in his posting ceremony, and the fingerprints match. A flashback reveals that Siddharth killed Shilpa's father so that she would not participate in the competition, and as she will not have a ticket to go to her father's funeral, he offers to take her in his chartered flight and wins her over.

Mithran frantically searches for the bug, which he eventually finds and removes. Mithran captures Vicky and records all the information from him. He drugs Vicky and manipulates Siddharth into killing him. At the same time, Siddharth's father reads the changed medical report, which contains very good medical contracts for public welfare and multiple accusations against Tamizhvanan. When Siddharth learns about this, he asks Sengalvarayan to pretend to have chest pains and move outside to the hospital. The ruling party forces Sengalvarayan either to resign within 24 hours or he will be dismissed. Mithran appeals to Tamizhvanan that he has evidence and wants to arrest Siddharth, and he is granted permission to do so. Hence Siddarth kills Sengalvarayan using his goons in an accident and forces Tamizhvanan to stop actions against him, or he will lie that Tamizhvanan killed his father for personal vengeance. However, the next day at Sengalvarayan's state funeral, Mithran arrests him on Tamizhvanan's orders.

When Siddharth is arrested, Mithran tells him that the medicine was patented in Manimekalai's name (despite Siddarth being the inventor) and will be made as generic medicine instead of a patent-protected one. It is also revealed that Sengalvarayan is still alive, saved by Mithran and his gang and the public funeral held was for Jana. Mithran makes a deal that he would save Siddharth's life for information and evidence on all of his criminal associates and activities and gives him a bulletproof vest to fake his death during his transport to the court. They also plan to take down the setup planned by various VIPs to kill Siddharth when one of them gets close to Siddharth, Mithran pushes him and learns that Siddharth did not wore the vest and is fatally shot by Shilpa. Before dying, Siddharth tells Mithran that he hid all the evidence in an SD card in the bulletproof vest, adding that he had not done it for the nation but because Mithran had asked for it. Siddharth's accomplices are arrested and the film ends with marriage of Mahima and Mithran.

Cast

Production

Development 
In June 2013, Mohan Raja stated that he would direct his brother Jayam Ravi again in a film to be produced by AGS Entertainment and that he had been working on the script for the past six months. Unlike his earlier ventures which were mainly remakes, he was said to have developed an original story concept. As before approaching Ravi for an original script, he turned down directing the Ramana remake with Akshay Kumar and denied the news working in the Ek Tha Tiger remake with Vijay as he earlier stated that Vijay was the reason for him to do the movie and believed him that he could pull off an original script as he had Vijay in mind for the script, but Vijay wanted Ravi to do the role to give Ravi the breakthrough. Raja said, "This film is close to my heart; it's an experimental script and I've put my heart and soul in penning it". The film began without a title and was referred to by the tentative title, Thani Oruvan, which was confirmed as the film's official title in June 2014.

Casting 
In July 2013, Nayanthara signed on to be part of the project, and her role was reported to be that of an aspiring police officer. Raja said he cast Nayanthara opposite Ravi because he "wanted a matured actress like her to be a part of the film". Ganesh Venkatraman was cast for a pivotal role, and the actor told that the film focuses on friendship and that he, Ravi and Nayanthara played friends in the film. In June 2014, Raja revealed that the team were still yet to film scenes featuring the lead antagonist with reports linking either Irrfan Khan, Arjun Rampal, Arya, R.Madhavan, Arvind Swamy, Arjun and Sudeep to the role, the pair however refuted the reports. It was later revealed that Arvind Swamy would be playing the antagonist. Raja wanted to cast an actor "whose attractiveness would act as a distraction from his evilness. And I chose one of the most attractive male actors in this country for that role". In March 2015, it was reported that the film would also feature Bollywood actress Mugdha Godse, who had been paired opposite Arvind Swamy and would make her Tamil début.

Crew 
Devi Sri Prasad, Yuvan Shankar Raja and S. Thaman were first reported to be the music composers of the film, with the latter revealing that he had been in talks. However, Hiphop Tamizha was finalised as the music director in March 2015. The film's cinematography was handled by Ramji, and V. T. Vijayan was at first in charge of the editing, but was later replaced by Gopi Krishna. Stunt Silva and Dhilip Subbarayan choreographed the action sequences, while the choreography for the songs were handled by Brinda.

Filming 
The principal photography for this film kickstarted on 6 December 2013, with a two-day schedule in Chennai at Binny Mills where a railway station set had been erected, and romantic flashback portions involving Jayam Ravi and Nayanthara were shot. The crew then moved to Bangalore in January 2014, where filming was held at a police training college. As of February 2014, filming was underway in Mahabalipuram, Bangalore, Sri Ramanujar Engg College, Vandalur  and Hyderabad. In March, Ravi stated that the team had also shot in Rishikesh, Dehradun and that the third schedule was currently happening in Mussoorie. This film was shot on film roll (analogue form of film making), by cinematographer Ramji, which he feels may be the last Tamil film to get shot in the film as the industry has moved to digital filming. The film's budget was initially planned to be ₹15 crores but surpassed ₹20 crores due to delay and budget overrun, Raja and Ravi had to forgo their salaries in order to complete the film. As of April 2015, the makers have completed 80% of the film's shoot, with three of the songs being needed to be canned, which were completed in June 2015, along with the completion of the film's principal photography.

Themes and influences 
A reporter from APHerald, reviewing the film, stated that the concept of implanting the electronic bug with the help of GPS and audio transmitter and monitoring the plan was inspired from the Korean film I Saw the Devil (2010). However, director Mohan Raja denied as co-incidence.

Music

Thani Oruvan's soundtrack album and background score was composed by Hiphop Tamizha. The album features five songs, four of them penned by the composer, and one written by Mohan Raja. Following the success of his debut independent album Hip Hop Tamizhan, Mohan Raja advised Adhi to compose the tracks with the essence of his independent music project. As a result, he composed two songs based on the indie music format. The soundtrack album was released on 25 July 2015 at the Suryan FM 93.5 Radio Station, with the presence of the film's cast and crew. Actor Aravind Swamy had recorded his voice over for "Theemai Dhan Vellum", which was used as a promotional song and was not featured in the film. This was later reused as "Manishi Musugulo Mrugam Neney Ra" in the Telugu remake of the film, Dhruva (2016).

Release

Theatrical and distribution
Sun Pictures initially signed a contract for the distribution rights for the film; they later opted out after numerous failures of Jayam Ravi and negative talk about the film; later AGS Entertainment, the production house of the film itself, acquired the distribution rights. The film was initially slated to release on 14 August 2015, coinciding with the Independence Day weekend, later the release was postponed to avoid a clash with Arya's Vasuvum Saravananum Onna Padichavanga and Silambarasan's Vaalu, which were slated to release on the same day. The film was scheduled for a solo release on 28 August 2015. The film's USA theatrical rights were sold to Atmus Entertainment, and was released in more than 18 screens in the USA.

Marketing 
The film's first look poster was released on 11 July 2015. The teaser of the film was released on 19 July 2015. The theatrical trailer was released on 15 August 2015.

Home media 
The satellite rights of the film were sold to Sun TV. The film's television premiere took place on 1 May 2016, coinciding with May Day.

Reception

Box office
The film collected  in Tamil Nadu in first day. It also collected US$1.87 Million in the United States. In Chennai, the film earned ₹1.28 crore in its first weekend; in its second weekend the film collected ₹1.06 crore at the box office. The total collection of the film by the end of 18 days was ₹34.86 crore. The film collected more than 65 crore within 10 days of its release at the worldwide collections.

Thani Oruvan completed 50 days of theatrical run, in which the film's worldwide collection was estimated to be over ₹150 crore. It was listed as one of the top 10 highest grossing Tamil films of the year.

Critical response 
The Times of India rated the film 4 out of 5 and wrote "Thani Oruvan is a bit too long [..] And even though it is a plot-driven film, the film gives us well-rounded characters, who lend the slightly far-fetched story plausibility". IndiaGlitz rated the film 4 out of 5 and called it a "must watch for any true movie lover". Baradwaj Rangan of The Hindu wrote, "Thani Oruvan makes the most of the sustained cat-and-mouse game between Mithran and Siddharth. The authors (Subha), are credited as co-writers, and this is the first time their pulp sensibility really shines through", calling it "a pretty, smart pulpy thriller". Behindwoods rated the film 3.25 out of 5 and stated "Raja delivers a commercial entertainer with all its necessary elements in an intelligent manner and in an engaging fashion". Rediff stated "Thoughtfully etched-out characters add depth and intensity to the narration, while great music and impressive cinematography enhance the overall experience". Sify wrote, "Powered by a staggering performance from Jayam Ravi and Arvind Swamy, director Mohan Raja does a good job of creating a taut, intelligent, and deliciously twisted action drama that delivers so much more than your average thriller...what makes Thani Oruvan, an enjoyable watch is its, original screenplay, the smart presentation and excellent characterisation". Deccan Chronicle gave it 3.5 stars and wrote, "With the use of technology, an emphasis on slyness and mind over matter, director M. Raja and his team have crafted a film that is sure to keep you at the edge of your seat while entertaining you thoroughly in the process". IBN Live rated the film 3.5 out of 5 and wrote "The film stands on one and a half legs because Siddharth Abhimanyu will rank among the best villains whereas Mithran IPS will miss the mark in the heroes section by a large margin, Nayanthara is deliciously comfortable in her role as Mahima". The core idea of implanting GPS and transmitter was reported to be based on the 2010 Korean movie I Saw The Devil.

Accolades

Sequel 
In July 2019, Jayam Ravi and director Mohan Raja, planned for the film's sequel, which was expected to start rolling in 2021.

Remakes 
The film was remade in Telugu titled Dhruva with Ram Charan and Rakul Preet Singh as lead performers with Arvind Swamy reprising his role in Telugu. The film was also remade in Bengali, titled One (2017) Starring  Yash Dasgupta and Prosenjit Chatterjee as protagonist and antagonist respectively and Nusrat Jahan as the heroine. The movie is directed by Birsa Dasgupta and produced by SVF Entertainment.

Dubbed versions 
The film was dubbed into Hindi as Double Attack 2 and released on YouTube on 23 June 2017 by Goldmines Telefilms.

Legacy 
Thani Oruvan was listed in Top 20 Best Films of 2015, by Baradwaj Rangan of The Hindu, and was also listed in Top 10 Best Films of the year by Sify. Daily news and Analysis also listed in their "Ten Tamil movies of 2015, you should never miss"

References

External links
 

2015 films
2015 action thriller films
2015 crime action films
2015 crime thriller films
Fictional portrayals of the Tamil Nadu Police
2010s Tamil-language films
Indian crime thriller films
Indian crime action films
Indian action thriller films
Films scored by Hiphop Tamizha
Films directed by Mohan Raja
Tamil films remade in other languages
Films shot in Chennai
Films shot in Bangalore
Films shot in Hyderabad, India
Films shot in Uttarakhand
Films about security and surveillance
Medical-themed films
Techno-thriller films
Films set in Switzerland